"Avant de partir" is a 1989 pop song recorded by Canadian singer Roch Voisine. It was released in July 1990 as the third and last single from his first studio album Hélène, on which it appears as the fourth track. It became a top ten hit in France.

Versions
"Avant de partir" was performed during Voisine's 1992 tour and thus included on the live albums Europe Tour and Roch Voisine Live, as well as on the compilation Best Of. Voisine recorded a new version of "Avant de partir" first in 2003 on his album Je te serai fidèle, then in 2013 as a duet with Véronic DiCaire, on his album Duophonique. Jonathan Hamard of Charts in France considered this cover version with DiCaire as one of the most well-made duets from Voisine's album.

Chart performance
In France, "Avant de partir" debuted at number 31 on the chart edition of 28 July 1990, had a peak at number seven in its seventh week, and remained for a total of six weeks in the top ten and 21 weeks in the top 50, dropping from the chart straight from number 28. It achieved Silver status, awarded by the Syndicat National de l'Édition Phonographique. On the European Hot 100 Singles, it debuted at number 54 on 18 August 1990, reached a peak of number 34 five weeks later, and fell off the top 100 after 19 weeks of presence.

Track listings
 12" maxi
 "Avant de partir" (new version) — 3:08
 "Là-bas dans l'ombre" — 3:36
 "Avant de partir" (instrumental) — 3:08

 7" single
 "Avant de partir" (new version) — 3:08
 "Avant de partir" (instrumental) — 3:08

 CD maxi
 "Avant de partir" (new version) — 3:08
 "Là-bas dans l'ombre" — 3:36
 "Avant de partir" (instrumental) — 3:08

Charts

Weekly charts

Certifications

Release history

References

1990 singles
Roch Voisine songs
1989 songs